Carlo Mosca  (12 October 1945 – 30 March 2021) was an Italian prefect and magistrate.

He was a knight of the Order of Merit of the Italian Republic.

References

External links
 
 

Italian prefects
Italian contract bridge players
1945 births
2021 deaths
Recipients of the Order of Merit of the Italian Republic
Deaths from pneumonia in Lazio